Tayabas, officially the City of Tayabas, is a 6th class component city in the province of Quezon, Philippines. According to the 2020 census, it has a population of 112,658 people.

It is known for lambanog (coconut arrack) and sweet food/delicacies, as well as tourism resorts. Tayabas is also known as the City of Festivals because of its colorful festivals. The city is known for resorts, heritage houses, historical landmarks, more than 20 Spanish stone bridges with under-carvings from Filipino ancestors, nationally important archaic stone crosses from the 16th century which is believed to be homes of nature spirits, rest and recreation destination, and festivities. It is the former capital of the Province of Tayabas, now Aurora and Quezon. The prevalent architectural sites of the city, including its bridges, has led numerous scholars to campaign its inclusion in the UNESCO World Heritage List.

History

Early History 
Tayabas is at the center of the province's long-settled heartland, which possessed the best lands, the oldest parishes, and the most active commercial centers.  The provincial heartland was later described by Pres. Manuel L. Quezon as having the "richest and gayest places in the province."

In 1578, Fray Juan de Plasencia and Fray Diego de Oropesa, two Franciscan missionaries from Spain founded the town of Tayabas in order to spread Christianity to its natives. Prior to the occupation, however, the native Tayabenses lived in rural settings typical to those times, with barangays headed by village chiefs and councils of elders. During this time, ancestral stones and rocks that the people believed to be homes of nature spirits were turned to stone crosses due to the influx of Christianity. These rocks were worshiped by Tayabas ancestors as deities or gods. These stone crosses exist up to this day, however, many have been stolen, uprooted, sold and destroyed due to the belief of foreign treasure hunters that each cross contains treasures.

Historians and archaeologists have disproved these claims by treasure hunters and have found no treasure in any archaic stone crosses in Tayabas. The destruction and uprooting of these crosses has "endangered the stone cross tradition of Tayabas."

From 1605 to 1901, Tayabas was the capital of the Province of Tayabas, now known as Quezon.  In the 19th century, Tayabas was among the biggest towns in the country.  Its Minor Basilica of St. Michael the Archangel, which was enlarged in the mid-1850s, is the longest church in the country and is a lasting testament to its glorious and historic past.

In more than three centuries of Spanish occupation, only eight cities and towns were given the title of Villa, and Tayabas was one of them.  These are La Villa del Santisimo Nombre de Jesus de Cebu in 1565, La Villa de Santiago de Libon (Albay, 1573), La Villa Fernandina de Vigan (Ilocos, 1574), La Villa Rica de Arevalo (Iloilo, 1581), La Noble Villa de Pila (Laguna, 1610), La Muy Noble Villa de Tayabas (Tayabas, 1703), La Villa de Bacolor (Pampanga, 1765), La Villa de Lipa (Batangas, 1887).  Tayabas was given the title of 'most noble' villa which means it was put in the ranks of nobility.

In the book "The Philippines", written by French traveler Jean Baptiste Mallat, and published in 1846, it appears that Tayabas had more than 21,000 people at that time.  This was reduced to 16,000 when Lucena became an independent town in 1879.  Due to low population growth during the Spanish period, this number remained unchanged until the coming of the Americans.

Philippine Revolution 
During the Philippine Revolution, a Spanish garrison occupying the massive church and convent buildings was besieged by Miguel Malvar's forces. The siege lasted 3 months, spanning from June 15, 1898 to August 15, 1898. The siege would end when the Spanish garrison unconditionally surrendered to Malvar's forces.

Tayabas has many places of interest.  Its Casa Comunidad, a centuries-old building, is the place where Apolinario "Hermano Pule" Dela Cruz was tried and sentenced to death in 1841.  It was restored in the 1990s through funds donated by the "Friends of Casa Comunidad," an organization of affluent Manila-based Tayabenses.

World War II 
Tayabas features numerous Spanish-era bridges which mirror its rich architectural past and serve as crucial connections to the city. Two of the longest bridges in Tayabas are the Malagonlong Bridge and the Malaoa bridges. During the second world war, Imperial Japanese Forces rapidly advanced toward the city, forcing the locals to rush fortifications. In a bid to slow the Japanese forces down, the locals planted explosives underneath the Malagonlong Bridge. The plan to destroy the bridge however was unsuccessful as the explosives failed to destroy the bridge. This can be attributed to the bridge's design, which was made to be extremely durable. Malagonlong Bridge was later declared a national historical site.

Later on in the war, the city of Tayabas became the target of small bombing runs from enemy forces. It again suffered a terrible blow near the end of World War II when it was completely burned to the ground after a bombing raid on 15 March 1945.  Prior to that, the old houses of Tayabas rivaled those of Vigan's Spanish-era structures.

The local resistance continued their efforts to fight the Japanese all the way to when American Liberation forces and the Philippine Commonwealth troops finally secured the area.

Cityhood 

On July 14, 2007, the municipality held a plebiscite to ratify the conversion of the said act, with the residents voting in favor of the move, although there was a low turnout of voters for the plebiscite.

The Supreme Court declared the cityhood law of Tayabas and 15 other cities unconstitutional after a petition filed by the League of Cities of the Philippines in its ruling on November 18, 2008. On December 22, 2009, the cityhood law of Tayabas and 15 other municipalities regain its status as cities again after the court reversed its ruling on November 18, 2008. On August 23, 2010, the court reinstated its ruling on November 18, 2008, causing Tayabas and 15 cities to become regular municipalities. Finally, on February 15, 2011, Tayabas becomes a city again including the 15 municipalities declaring that the conversion to cityhood met all legal requirements.

After six years of legal battle, in its board resolution, the League of Cities of the Philippines acknowledged and recognized the cityhood of Tayabas and 15 other cities.

Geography

Barangays
Tayabas is politically subdivided into 66 barangays.

Climate

Demographics

Economy 

The major agricultural products of Tayabas are rice and coconut. It is also known for Sweet delicacies, Budin (Cassava cake) and lambanog.

Notable Places of Interest
Tayabas is rich in history as it was the capital of Tayabas Province (Now in Quezon) during Spanish era. There are falls, caves, river, and hills/mountains to discover.

Minor Basilica of St. Michael the Archangel The Minor Basilica of St. Michael the Archangel is a Roman Catholic basilica located in Tayabas, Quezon. It is the largest Catholic church in the Province of Quezon. It is renowned for having the shape of a key. Locals often refer to the church as Susi ng Tayabas. On October 18, 1988, the title Minor Basilica was conferred by Pope John Paul II. It was proclaimed on January 21, 1989.

Casa Comunidad de Tayabas Constructed in 1831 when Don Diego Enriquez was gobernadorcillo, it is primarily designed as a guesthouse for visiting Spanish dignitaries. According to Buzeta and Brazo, Tayabas in 1851 had a Casa de Comunidad where the prison was located. The Tribunal seems to have been located in the Casa as well. In 1887, Juan Alvarez Guerra, a Spanish official, says that "beyond dispute, it is one of the best in the Philippines... It has spacious halls, magnificent decor, and ornate furniture". He adds that at one corner of the Tribunal was the telegraph station. Unfortunately, shortly after his book was written, a horrific fire consumed the building as well as others in the city. Alfred Marache locates the fire at around 1882–1883. During the American period, the reconstructed building became a public school. Thus from being the center of the local judicial system, it became the center of the community's intellectual life. It was destroyed once more in the bombing of 1945. In the 2000s, Casa de Comunidad was reconstructed by the National Historical Institute. Casa de Comunidad is a national historical landmark which houses the local museum and the municipal library. It is host to many cultural and historical activities. This century old building, is the place where Apolinario "Hermano Pule" Dela Cruz was tried and sentenced to death in 1841.

Malagonlong Bridge A declared historical site by the National Historical Institute and a potential candidate for UNESCO World Heritage, Malogonlong Bridge is one of the oldest and longest stone arched bridges found in province of Quezon. It is a  bridge built between 1840 and 1850 under the direction of the "Ministro del Pueblo," Fray Antonio Mattheos, a Franciscan priest. It was the longest bridge ever made during the Spanish colonial era with approximately 100,000 adobe blocks used.

Nuestra Señora de las Angustias One of the oldest church in Tayabas. The chapel was built in 1838. In 1887, the chapel was described as having a small cloister, a modest presbytery and a sacristy to the right side of the presbytery. The walls had four windows of capiz and glass. In March 1945, the chapel was destroyed due to American bombings and only the walls remained. However, the walls served as a guide to its eventual restoration.

Sanctuario de las Almas Built in 1855, the church was called "Cementerio de los Españoles" during the Spanish period. A former cemetery and now a place for devotees of San Diego de Alcala.

Camposanto de los Indios The cemetery was built in 1887. Today it is called "kamposanto". The cemetery has a gate composed of two stone column that carry a grill sign. The grills have two designs: 10 A rising sun symbolizing hope and thus a new life; 2) "O muerte, que amarga es tu memoria" (O Death, how bitter is your memory), and "Bienventurados los muertos que mueren en el Señor" (Blessed are the deceased who die in the Lord).

Calle Budin Kalye Budin is actually a short portion of Emilio Jacinto Street, a few blocks away from the public market, where local and foreign tourists drop by just to grab freshly baked budins (sold at PHP 28/USD 0.64/IDR 5,714 per cake) and other delicacies the town and the province are known for. Nilupak (pound cassava cake), halayang ube (sweet purple yam/taro), ube candy, pastillas (milk candy), espasol (sticky rice snack) and tikoy (the local version of the Chinese sticky rice cake) can also be found there. Lucban longganisa (sausage), pansit Lucban (noodles), puto seko (rice cookies) and the potent but liked lambanog (coconut wine/vodka), uraro (arrowroot cookies from Catanauan) and apas (thin sweet cookies from Sariaya), as well as mazapan (another kind of milk candy), cassava chips, fish crackers and meringue are also sold.

Transportation 
Jeepneys and tricycles are common options when travelling to destinations within the downtown and the city.

Notable personalities 
 Orlando Nadres (1938–1991) – writer
 Ireneo Samaniego – Leader of the Tayabas Regiment stationed in Malate, Manila who fought the Spaniards at Fort Santiago in 1843 to avenge the death of Hermano Pule. 
 Bishop Alfredo Maria Obviar – first bishop of the Diocese of Lucena, founder of MCST, declared a Servant of God
 Hermana Fausta Labrador – born in Tayabas/founder of Sacred Heart College (Lucena City).  her father's surname was originally San Agustin until he changed it to Labrador in compliance with the decree of Governor General Narciso Claveria
 Paraluman (Sigrid Sophia Agatha von Giese y de Torres) – December 4, 1923April 27, 2009 – Award-winning actress active from the 1940s to the 1970s
 Isidro Cabuyao Sia – 1992 TOYM awardee for Pharmacology
 Victor Emmanuel Carmelo "Vim" D. Nadera, Jr. – 2003 TOYM awardee for Literature
 Heidi Lloce Mendoza – Undersecretary General for the United Nations Office of Internal Oversight. The truth teller during the anomaly in AFP, and Quezon Medalya ng Karangalan awardee.
 Belen Palad – Quezon Medalya ng Karangalan Awardee 2013 Agriculture
 Tommy Abuel – a multi-awarded actor in the Philippines.

Sister cities
  Lucena, Philippines
  Makati, Philippines

See also
List of Cultural Properties of Tayabas

References

External links

 
 [ Philippine Standard Geographic Code]
 Philippine Census Information
 Local Governance Performance Management System

 
Cities in Quezon
Populated places established in 1578
1578 establishments in the Philippines
Former provincial capitals of the Philippines
Component cities in the Philippines